Pseudoxenodon macrops, commonly known as the large-eyed bamboo snake or the big-eyed bamboo snake, is a species of venomous rear-fanged snake endemic to Asia.

Description

P. macrops is a fairly variable species with brownish and almost blackish shades with short crossbars.

Diet
P. macrops preys on frogs and lizards.

Venom
P. macrops is a venomous species. However, the potency of its venom is currently unknown.

Reproduction
P. macrops is an oviparous species. An adult female may lay as many as 10 eggs.

Subspecies
There are three known subspecies including, the nominotypical subspecies.

Pseudoxenodon macrops fukiensis 
Pseudoxenodon macrops macrops 
Pseudoxenodon macrops sinensis 

Nota bene: A binomial authority or a trinomial authority in parentheses indicates that the species or subspecies was originally described in a genus other than Pseodoxenodon.

Geographic range
P. macrops is found in Northeast India (Darjeeling, Assam, Arunachal Pradesh, Mizoram), Nepal, Bhutan, Myanmar, Thailand, West Malaysia, Vietnam, Laos, SW China (Yunnan, Guangxi, Guangdong, Fujian, Sichuan, Guizhou ?, Gansu). It is also found in Sylhet region of Bangladesh.

References

Further reading
Blyth E. 1855. Notices and Descriptions of various Reptiles, new or little known [part 2]. J. Asiatic Soc. Bengal, Calcutta 23 (3): 287–302. (Tropidonotus macrops, new species, pp. 296–297).
Boulenger GA. 1890. The Fauna of British India, Including Ceylon and Burma. Reptilia and Batrachia. London: Secretary of State for India in Council. (Taylor and Francis, printers). xviii + 541 pp. (Pseudoxenodon macrops, pp. 340–341).
Smith MA. 1943. The Fauna of British India, Ceylon and Burma, Including the Whole of the Indo-Chinese Sub-region. Reptilia and Amphibia. Vol. III.—Serpentes. London: Secretary of State for India. (Taylor and Francis, printers). xii + 583 pp. (Pseudoxenodon macrops, pp. 311–313).

Pseudoxenodon
Snakes of Asia
Reptiles of Bangladesh
Reptiles of Bhutan
Snakes of China
Reptiles of India
Reptiles of Laos
Reptiles of Myanmar
Reptiles of Nepal
Reptiles of Thailand
Reptiles of Malaysia
Snakes of Vietnam
Reptiles described in 1855
Taxa named by Edward Blyth